The women's trampoline competition at the 2019 European Games was held at the Minsk-Arena on 24 June 2019.

Qualification
The top six gymnasts with one per country advanced to the final.

Final

References 

Women's trampoline